Sino-Christian theology  ( or , literally meaning "Christian theology in the Chinese language") is a theological movement in Mainland China and Hong Kong.

Definition 
There are two generally recognized senses of the term Sino-Christian theology.  In the broad sense, it belongs to the tradition of indigenous theology which stretches as early as the works during the time of the Jesuit China missions, until the present day.  However, these indigenizing efforts are often critiqued for a lacking in their assessments of traditional Chinese culture, particularly as found in Confucianism.  In the narrow sense of the term, Sino-Christian theology is associated with cultural Christians like Liu Xiaofeng and He Guanghu who have challenged the indigenizing approach and have proposed the greater need to articulate a critically reflective theology using the Chinese language.

In recent years, it has been observed that there has perhaps been the growth of a younger generation of scholars in Sino-Christian theology.  While the earlier generation included so-called "cultural Christians" who often used methodologies within the humanities and social sciences, the younger generation includes individuals who identify themselves as “Christian scholars” with a greater commitment to the Christian faith and believe the use of the human sciences is inadequate for articulating Christian theology. Many have become elders and pastors in urban churches, and often gravitated towards Calvinism as a means to offer a public theology for the Chinese Christian church.

Theological themes 
Much of the writings within this field have looked at Christian theology as a means to engage China, in its pursuit for modernity. Often, this has focused on comparing Western culture, shaped by Christianity, with Chinese culture, shaped by Confucianism and Daoism.

One areas of discussion has been around the Christian doctrine of sin. Liu Xiaofeng and Zhuo Xinping, for instance, have described China as having a "culture of joy" whereas the West has a "culture of sin." In a post-Cultural Revolution context, they explain how the doctrine of original sin is useful in explaining the social ills that exist in contemporary Chinese society.

Another area is with regards to morality. Whereas Confucianism is often understood as fundamentally a system of ethics, some have written about how the Christian understanding of morality has been shaped by the two commands of loving God and loving neighbor. Yang Huilin has gone as far as to compare Auschwitz with the Cultural Revolution, and speak of how the Christian virtues of love and forgiveness may benefit the Chinese context.

See also 

 Chinese names for the God of Abrahamic religions
 Chinese theology
 Chinese Rites Controversy
 Political theology in China
 Centre for Sino-Christian Studies
 Milton Wai-yiu Wan

Notes

References

Further reading

External links
 Institute of Sino-Christian Studies

Christianity in China
Religion in Hong Kong
Christian theology